New Hampton is an unincorporated community located within Lebanon Township in Hunterdon County, New Jersey, United States.

New Hampton is the birthplace of Revolutionary War General Daniel Morgan.

Points of interest
The New Hampton Historic District was added to the National Register of Historic Places on April 6, 1998 for its significance in architecture, commerce, education, transportation, and community development.

The Lebanon Township Museum, in the  schoolhouse, supports local history and is next to the memorial to General Daniel Morgan.

Notable people
James M. J. Sanno, U.S. Army brigadier general who was born and raised in New Hampton

References

Lebanon Township, New Jersey
Unincorporated communities in Hunterdon County, New Jersey
Unincorporated communities in New Jersey